The 1967–68 season was the 69th completed season of the English Football League.

For the first time since 1937 Manchester City won the league title, finishing two points clear of their local rivals Manchester United. Fulham finished bottom of the league and were relegated along with Sheffield United. Coventry City, in their first ever top flight season escaped relegation by one point and would go on to stay in the top division until their eventual relegation at the end of the 2000–01 season.

Bill McGarry's Ipswich Town team won the Second Division by one point from Queens Park Rangers, with both teams promoted. Blackpool finished third on goal average and so missed out. Rotherham United and bottom club Plymouth Argyle were both relegated to the Third Division.

Oxford United won their first divisional title and achieved what was then their highest ever finish in only their sixth season as a league club in the Third Division. Runners-up Bury joined them in promotion. Grimsby Town, Colchester United and Scunthorpe United were relegated, although the biggest story concerned bottom placed Peterborough United who were docked 19 points for offering irregular bonuses to their players. Had the points been restored the club would have finished in the top half. As a result of the ruling Mansfield Town escaped relegation.

Luton Town won the Fourth Division and were promoted along with Barnsley, Hartlepools United and Crewe Alexandra. No clubs were voted out of the league.

Final league tables and results

Beginning with the season 1894–95, clubs finishing level on points were separated according to goal average (goals scored divided by goals conceded), or more properly put, goal ratio. In case one or more teams had the same goal difference, this system favoured those teams who had scored fewer goals. The goal average system was eventually replaced by goal difference, beginning with the 1976–77 season.

Since the Fourth Division was established in the 1958–59 season, the bottom four teams of that division were required to apply for re-election.

First Division

Results

Maps

Second Division

Results

Maps

Third Division

Results

Maps

Fourth Division

Results

Maps

See also 
 1967–68 in English football

References 

Ian Laschke: Rothmans Book of Football League Records 1888–89 to 1978–79. Macdonald and Jane's, London & Sydney, 1980.

 
English Football League seasons